is a Japanese professional shogi player ranked 6-dan.

Promotion history
The promotion history for Yamamoto is as follows:
 6-kyū: 1986
 1-dan: 1989
 4-dan: October 1, 1996
 5-dan: November 5, 2004
 6-dan: April 1, 2016

References

External links
ShogiHub: Professional Player Info · Yamamoto, Shinnya [sic]

Japanese shogi players
Living people
Professional shogi players
Professional shogi players from Osaka Prefecture
People from Higashiōsaka
1971 births
Free class shogi players